Thiomargarita is a genus (family Thiotrichaceae) which includes the vacuolate sulfur bacteria species Thiomargarita namibiensis, Candidatus Thiomargarita nelsonii, and Ca. Thiomargarita joergensii.

Representatives of this genus can be found in a variety of environments that are rich in hydrogen sulfide, including methane seeps, mud volcanoes, brine pools, and organic-rich sediments such as those found beneath the Benguela Current and Humboldt Current. These bacteria are generally considered to be chemolithotrophs that utilize reduced inorganic species of sulfur as metabolic electron donors to produce energy for the fixation of carbon into biomass.  Carbon fixation occurs via the Calvin Benson Bassham cycle and possibly the reverse Krebs cycle.

References

Thiotrichales
Lithotrophs
Bacteria described in 1999
Bacteria genera